Henry Caldera (19 August 1937 – 11 October 2006) was a Sri Lankan singer, songwriter, and musician.

Early life and education
Caldera was born on 19 August 1937. Completely blind at the age of 14, he attended the Seeduwa Deaf and Blind School. There, Caldera studied under maestro Sunil Shantha, who conducted classes for blind students. After leaving school, Caldera continued to learn from Shantha at his house in Dehiyagatha, Ja-Ela.

Career
Caldera became a radio artist in 1968 and recorded his first hit song Thara Petia in 1972. He subsequently released a four-song album in 1977. During his lifetime he released three audio cassettes and two compact discs. Most his songs were solos, and children's songs; it is said that Caldera often sang for his own children and grandchildren.

Honors
In 1979, the Prime Minister of Sri Lanka, Ranasinghe Premadasa, donated a house for Caldera to live. In 1993, Caldera received a Kala Bhushana award (the second highest award granted by the state to performing artists). Student bodies at several universities and non-governmental organizations honored him in appreciation of his service to folk music.

Personal life, and death
Caldera firmly believed that art is art and nothing could buy an artist; he held on to this belief until he died.

Caldera had four children with his wife, who was also blind. He was diagnosed with cancer in 2004 and died on 11 October 2006. Caldera's second son, Chaminda, sings in his memory.

Discography
Some of his top songs include:

Thara Patiya 
Penuna Suwa Dasun 
Midule Sudu Weli Thalaye 
Eeye Udaye 
Lanka Mage Lanka 
Mokada Nago (Duet) 
Pemin Bandennai 
Oba Pewa Hasarella 
Sisila Sendaewe 
Kana Widina Wele 
Mal Natu Weni 
Andannepa Amme 
Samanala Siripa 
Melowa Thibena 
Suhadiniye 
Kanda Udin (Duet) 
Mage somi sanda 
Deva Meniyane 
Nahawa rasa kiri powa 
Hinaweyan sudu saman male 
Gayakayanani 
Mawage malagama 
Malli (Duet) 
Sanahase sihil nille (Duet) 
Budu Piye 
Etha Hime Ran Samanala Kanda Naginna 
Anna Duwe Handa Mama 
Hitha Ridunado Priye 
Sanda Aran Evilla 
Ninda Soya 
Sahayata Bhawa Saharawe 
Sihina Sandalle 
Mudu Sumudu Kumuda 
Dinindu Negi

References

1937 births
2006 deaths
Blind musicians
Children's musicians
Sinhalese musicians
20th-century Sri Lankan male singers
Deaths from cancer in Sri Lanka
Sri Lankan singer-songwriters
Sinhalese singers